Zoran Nikolić may refer to:

 Zoran Nikolić (basketball) (born 1996), Montenegrin basketball player
 Zoran Nikolić (footballer) (born 1960), Serbian footballer